Acid-Fest: A Tribute to Trent Acid was an interpromotional professional wrestling memorial event co-produced by the Combat Zone Wrestling (CZW) and Jersey All Pro Wrestling (JAPW) promotions, which took place on July 10, 2010, at the Viking Hall in South Philadelphia, Pennsylvania. The show was held in honor of Trent Acid, one-half of the independent wrestling tag team The Backseat Boyz with Johnny Kashmere, who died of an accidental drug overdose at his home in Philadelphia less than a month before. It was the second such event held at the venue following the Pitbull/Public Enemy Memorial Cup, an event The Backseat Boyz had participated at, in 2006. It was the 106th wrestling event held by CZW in the building, once known as the ECW Arena, surpassing the record number of events held by Extreme Championship Wrestling. Six professional wrestling matches were featured on the event's card with all the participants being among Acid's closest friends in the industry.

Show
The main event was a standard wrestling match between Johnny Kashmere and Devon Moore. Kashmere was accompanied to the ring by Donnie B, a retired manager and owner of Phoenix Championship Wrestling, who agreed to make a one-time appearance at the event. It was Donnie who had paired the two together earlier in their careers. The match was originally scheduled to be a Three-Way Dance between Kashmere, Moore and CZW founder John Zandig, however, Zandig was forced to pull out when he was seriously injured in a car accident a week before the show.

Another featured match was a four-way tag team elimination match with The S.A.T., The Carnage Crew, Da Hit Squad and The H8 Club, managed by Dewey Donovan and Justice Pain, which The S.A.T. won; the match was also the first time that Da Hit Squad had wrestled as a team in six years. Homicide and B-Boy defeated Sonjay Dutt and Ruckus in a tag team match and a 6-person tag team match between Amy Lee, Missy Sampson and Annie Social, as "Acid's Angels", beat Alere Little Feather, Roxxie Cotton and Detox. The event also hosted one of the largest battle royals ever held, involving a "cast of thousands" as one reviewer called it, and included wrestlers from throughout Acid's career from personal friends to his own students. The battle royal was won by Acid's childhood friend Helter Skelter, with manager Missy Hyatt, after eliminating Big Vito.

One of the highlights of the show came when Lou E. Dangerously, in his "Danger Zone" interview segment, gave a short speech to the crowd and brought out Tod Gordon, founder of Extreme Championship Wrestling and co-promoter of Pro Wrestling Unplugged with Kashmere, who both presented a plaque to Trent Acid's parents, for "Acid's lifetime achievements in professional wrestling". He was also unexpectedly inducted into the ECW Arena Hardcore Hall of Fame by CZW owner D. J. Hyde during the event's opening ceremony. The event was free of charge with a suggested $10 minimum donation to the Trent Acid Memorial Fund to help pay for the funeral costs, a fee paid by all the wrestlers that night, and was successful in raising $7,540 by the end of the show. Additional money was raised through merchandise sales of Acid-Fest T-shirts and programs, and a memorabilia auction of a World Wrestling Entertainment watch, designed to look like a spinner belt, donated by John Cena. The show was attended by an estimated 650 to 750 fans and was filmed by several different companies, most notably Smart Mark Video and RF Video, and later released on DVD.

Results

References

External links
 Acid-Fest: A Tribute To Trent Acid on Cagematch.net

2010 in professional wrestling
Professional wrestling in Pennsylvania
Professional wrestling memorial shows
2010 in sports in Pennsylvania
Jersey All Pro Wrestling
Combat Zone Wrestling shows